The original St. Louis Steamers played in the original Major Indoor Soccer League from 1979 through 1988. Their home fixtures were held at the St. Louis Arena. The Steamers were popular for a number of years, with average attendance exceeding 12,000 for each season from 1980–81 through 1984–85, and outdrawing the NHL's St. Louis Blues for four consecutive seasons from 1980–81 through 1983–84.

Ownership
 Marvin Mann (1979–1980)
 Stan Musial & Partnership (1980–83)
 Thomas M. Bowers & Partnership (1983–87)
 Bing Devine (1987–88)

History

The Major Indoor Soccer League awarded St. Louis a franchise on July 31, 1979. The home opener on December 14, 1979 drew over 18,000 fans to the Arena. Part of the Steamers' attraction was that their roster was drawn in large part from local talent.

The Steamers' popularity reached its peak during the 1981–82 season, when the team averaged 17,107 fans per game, including 19,298 fans in the Steamers' match at the Arena against the Denver Avalanche. In 1981–82, the Steamers won their second straight division title, and reached the MISL Championship finals, where they lost to New York in a five-game series.

The Steamers played their final match on April 15, 1988 in front of 4,839 fans. Following the 1987–88 season, the club folded, and the MISL terminated the Steamers' franchise.

Year-by-year

Retired numbers
 #30 Slobo Ilijevski
 #7  Daryl Doran

Coaches
 Pat McBride (1979–81) (1985–87)
 Al Trost (1981–83)
 Dave Clements (1983–85)
 Tony Glavin (1987–88)

Yearly Awards
MISL Rookie of the Year
1980–81 – Don Ebert

MISL Goalkeeper of the Year
1981–1982 – Slobo Ilijevski
1983–1984 – Slobo Ilijevski

MISL All-Star Team Selection
1980–1981 – Steve Pecher
1980–1981 – Tony Glavin
1981–1982 – Slobo Ilijevski
1983–1984 – Slobo Ilijevski
1983–1984 – Sam Bick

MISL Coach of the Year
1979–80 – Pat McBride (Jointly held)

See also
 Soccer in St. Louis
 St. Louis Stars
 St. Louis Storm (1989–92)
 St. Louis Ambush (1992–2000)
 AC St. Louis (2010)
 Record attendances in United States club soccer

References

 
Steamers 1979-88
Soccer clubs in Missouri
Defunct indoor soccer clubs in the United States
Major Indoor Soccer League (1978–1992) teams
1979 establishments in Missouri
1988 disestablishments in Missouri
Association football clubs established in 1979
Association football clubs disestablished in 1988